Dame Eleanor Warwick King,  (née Hamilton; born 13 September 1957) is a British judge of the Court of Appeal of England and Wales.

Biography
Born as Eleanor Warwick Hamilton (and known by her maiden name until being appointed as a judge), she was educated at Queen Margaret's School, York and at Hull University (LLB). She was called to the Bar, Inner Temple in 1979. She was an Assistant Recorder from 1996 to 2000.

She took silk in 1999 and was appointed as a deputy High Court judge and recorder. She was appointed as a High Court judge, assigned to the Family Division on 4 April 2008. In 2011 she was awarded an honorary PhD from Hull University in recognition of her work in the Law.

In 2014, she was appointed a Court of Appeal Judge.

Family
Lady Justice King's husband, Tom King, is also a Hull University law graduate (1973–1976). The couple have four daughters.

Affiliations
Fellow of the International Academy of Matrimonial Lawyers

References

External links
 Profile, The Times Online; accessed 18 March 2014. 
 Judge Eleanor King biodata, uk.sourcews.com; accessed 18 March 2014.

1957 births
Living people
Alumni of the University of Hull
English barristers
English women judges
Dames Commander of the Order of the British Empire
Family Division judges
People educated at Queen Margaret's School, York
People from Selby District
21st-century King's Counsel
Lady Justices of Appeal
Members of the Privy Council of the United Kingdom